The Alfred Dunhill Championship is a men's professional golf tournament which is played in South Africa. It is part of the Southern African Sunshine Tour and is one of several events in South Africa that are co-sanctioned by the more prestigious European Tour.

History
The tournament was founded in 2000, but its origins lie in Dunhill's sponsorship of the South African PGA Championship between 1995 and 1999. Following the 1999 Alfred Dunhill PGA Championship, the company decided to discontinue their association with the South African PGA, and create their own stand alone tournament. The first event was held in January 2000 at the Houghton Golf Club in Johannesburg, and replaced the South African PGA Championship on the European Tour calendar.

In 2004, the tournament was rescheduled to December, resulting in two events being staged that year; one in January and one in December. Following this change, the Alfred Dunhill Championship has formed part of the following year's European Tour season. In addition, the event was moved to the Leopard Creek Country Club, just south of the Kruger National Park in Malalane, Mpumalanga.

The 2021 event was scheduled to take place at Leopard Creek Country Club from 9–12 December. It was to be a co-sanctioned event between the European Tour and the Sunshine Tour. However due to COVID-19 travel restrictions in place in the UK from South Africa, the event was cancelled less than two weeks before the tournament was due to start.

Flagship event
In 2016, the Alfred Dunhill Championship replaced the South African Open as the tour's flagship event by the Official World Golf Ranking governing board. The winner was awarded 32 OWGR points. The change only lasted for one edition before reverting to the South African Open the following year as no tournament was held. In 2020, the Alfred Dunhill Championship once again became the tour's flagship event. The event was intended to be the flagship event again in 2021. However due to the cancellation of the tournament, the flagship event status was passed onto the South African Open.

Winners

Notes

References

External links

Coverage on the European Tour's official site

Sunshine Tour events
European Tour events
Golf tournaments in South Africa
Recurring sporting events established in 2000
2000 establishments in South Africa